Miyana (also Romanized as Mīýānā) is a Pashtun tribe of Durrani clan having their origin from Mianishien Mountains in Kandahar, Afghanistan.

They are a Pashtun tribe indigenous to northern Kandahar province of Afghanistan. There was little ethnographic literature on the Miana beyond the observations of some 19th and early 20th century British civil and military personnel prior to the research of Zahir Khan Advocate.

Miana is related to Qais Abdul Rasheed through his grandson whose name was also Miana.

Miyanishin District is a mountainous area of Kandahar Province.
Miana are part of greater Pashtun family called Sarbani which also includes Durrani, Tarin, etc.

History
The origin of the Miyana may be connected with Hephthalites, who had a large nomadic confederation that included present-day Afghanistan and Pakistan in the 5th-6th centuries AD, as well as with Scythians, who are known to have settled where most Pashtuns live today.

Prominent People
Abū-Sa'īd Abul-Khayr
Emir Baba Khan Miana (Grandson of Qais Abdul Rasheed)
Khawaja Dawood Abu al-Fateh
Safoora Qadiriyya
Saleh Muhammad
Saleha Qadiriyya
Haji Muhammad

Detail
Miana was the son of Shrakhboon who was the son of Sarban. Sarban's father was Qais Abdul Rasheed who is considered the founding father of Pathan or Afghan nation.

Qais Abdul Rasheed
Qais Abdul Rasheed was known to be the pioneer of Pakhtuns. From Sara, Qias Abdul Rasheed had three sons named Sarban, Garghashti, and Batni. 

Sarban is the pioneer of Sarbani Pukhtoons. He had two sons named Shrakhboon and Khrashboon.

Shrakhboon had six sons named Urmur, Bareech, Tareen, Miana, Babar, and Sheerani.

Western View
Accounts of earliest contact of the Miana tribe with the British are not known, but the British became familiar with these peoples as diplomatic relations between the Durrani Empire and the British Raj increased. Mianas living around the vicinity of Multan migrated to the British protectorate princely state of Bahawalpur to avoid persecution as forces of Ranjit Singh tighten their grip on Punjab. According to gazettes of British Raj during 1800s, Miana are Afghans from sarbani pashtun tribe.

References 

Pashtun tribes